Robert Burgess may refer to:

Robert Forrest Burgess (born 1927), American writer
Rob Burgess (born 1957), Canadian tech industry executive
Bobby Burgess (born 1941), American dancer and singer
Robert Burgess (boxer) (born 1952), Bermudan boxer
Sir Robert Burgess (sociologist) (1947–2022), Vice-Chancellor of the University of Leicester
Robert Burgess (rugby union) (1890–1915), Irish rugby player